The 1984 Scott Tournament of Hearts, the Canadian women's national curling championship, was played February 25 to March 3, 1984 at the Charlottetown Forum in Charlottetown, Prince Edward Island. The total attendance for the week was a then-record 24,131.

Team Manitoba, who was skipped by Connie Laliberte won the event as they defeated two-time defending champion Nova Scotia in the final 5–4. Manitoba advanced to the final after beating British Columbia in the semifinal 5–4. This was Manitoba's third championship overall and the first of three championships skipped by Laliberte. The Laliberte rink would go onto represent Canada in the 1984 World Women's Curling Championship held in Perth, Scotland, which they also won.

Nova Scotia was the first to do this in Draw 7 as they stole the first five ends of their game against Prince Edward Island in an 8–1 victory. Nova Scotia would fall victim to the same feat two draws later when Saskatchewan stole the second through sixth ends en route to an 8–2 victory.

Teams
The teams were listed as follows:

Round Robin Standings
Final Round Robin standings

Round Robin results

Draw 1
Saturday, February 25

Draw 2
Sunday, February 26

Draw 3
Sunday, February 26

Draw 4
Monday, February 27

Draw 5
Monday, February 27

Draw 6
Tuesday, February 28

Draw 7
Tuesday, February 28

Draw 8
Wednesday, February 29

Draw 9
Wednesday, February 29

Draw 10
Thursday, March 1

Draw 11
Thursday, March 1

Tiebreaker
Friday, March 2

Playoffs

Semifinal
Friday, March 2

Final
Saturday, March 3

Statistics

Top 5 player percentages
Final Round Robin Percentages

Awards
The all-star team and sportsmanship award winners were as follows:

All-Star Team

Elizabeth MacDonald Award 
The Scotties Tournament of Hearts Sportsmanship Award is presented to the curler who best embodies the spirit of curling at the Scotties Tournament of Hearts. The winner was selected in a vote by all players at the tournament. 

Prior to 1998, the award was named after a notable individual in the curling community where the tournament was held that year. For this edition, the award was named after Elizabeth MacDonald, who was an influential builder for women's curling in Prince Edward Island as she founded the first women's competition at the Charlottetown Curling Club in 1950 and responsible for the formation of the PEI Ladies Curling Association in 1959.

Notes

References

Scotties Tournament of Hearts
Scott Tournament of Hearts
Scott Tournament Of Hearts, 1984
Curling competitions in Charlottetown
Scott Tournament of Hearts
Scott Tournament of Hearts
Scott Tournament of Hearts